The first season of Undercover premiered on BNT 1 on April 17, 2011 and ended on July 3, 2011.

Plot
Martin, the ex-con, is infiltrated by the police into a criminal group owned by Petar Tudzharov "Dzharo" to provide information about them. Martin later informs inspector Popov that Dzharo has an inside man in the police.

Cast

Main
 Ivaylo Zahariev as Martin Hristov
 Irena Miliankova as Silvia Veleva - Sunny
 Zahary Baharov as Ivo Andonov
 Vladimir Penev as Inspector Emil Popov
 Mihail Bilalov as Petar Tudzharov - Dzharo
 Alexander Sano as Zdravko Kiselov - The Hair
 Deyan Donkov as Vasil Nikolov
 Kiril Efremov as Tihomir Gardev - Tisho the Twin
 Ventsislav Yankov as Nikolay Rashev - Niki the Twin
 Ivaylo Hristov as Kiril Hristov
 Marian Valev as Rosen Gatzov - The Hook

Recurring
 Hristo Mutafchiev as Alexander Mironov (episodes 10-12)
 Tzvetana Maneva as Cveta Andonova (episodes 2, 6-7, 10, 12)

Episodes

External links
 Pod Prikritie Official website
 Pod Prikritie Facebook
 New Films International: Undercover
 

Bulgarian television series
2011 Bulgarian television series debuts
2010s Bulgarian television series
2016 Bulgarian television series endings